Tony Gugino (born May 7, 1986) is an American professional basketball player for Academic Plovdiv of the Bulgarian National Basketball League. He played college basketball for Hillsdale College.

Professional career
During his career, Gugino played for Basket-club Boncourt, SAM Basket Massagno, BC Yambol, BC Rilski Sportist and BBC Monthey.

In July 2014, Gugino signed with BC Rilski Sportist. After spending two seasons in Romania with Phoenix Galați, He signed with Rilski Sportist on August 30, 2018.

Gugino played for CS Dinamo București of the Liga Națională in the 2019–20 season, averaging 6.5 points and 3.4 rebounds per game. On July 21, 2020, he signed with Academic Plovdiv in Bulgaria.

References

External links
 at basketball.eurobasket.com
 at hillsdalechargers.com
 at basketball.realgm.com

1986 births
Living people
American expatriate basketball people in Belgium
American expatriate basketball people in Bulgaria
American expatriate basketball people in Romania
American expatriate basketball people in Switzerland
American men's basketball players
Basketball players from Michigan
BBC Monthey players
BC Rilski Sportist players
BC Yambol players
Hillsdale Chargers men's basketball players
Liège Basket players
People from Holland, Michigan
Power forwards (basketball)
SAM Basket players